Harry Peacock (born August 1978) is an English actor. He is known for his recurring role in Toast of London as the featured rival, Ray Purchase.

Early and personal life
Peacock was born in August 1978 in London, England. He is son of the actor and songwriter Trevor Peacock and actor Tilly Tremayne. He appeared alongside his father in a father/son relationship in the UK TV series Kingdom. His half-brother is actor and director Daniel Peacock.

Peacock is married to actress Katherine Parkinson. They have two children together. Peacock and Parkinson both star in The Kennedys.

Filmography

References

External links
 

1978 births
Living people
20th-century British male actors
21st-century British male actors
British male film actors
British male television actors
Male actors from London
Peacock family